Jerome Edward Brooks (born March 23, 1967) is a former Major League Baseball outfielder for the Los Angeles Dodgers and Florida Marlins. He played in 17 games during the 1993 and 1996 seasons. He also played for the Nippon-Ham Fighters of the Japanese Pacific League.

Brooks attended Clemson University. In 1987 he played collegiate summer baseball with the Cotuit Kettleers of the Cape Cod Baseball League and was named a league all-star. He was selected by the Dodgers in the 12th round of the 1988 MLB Draft.

Brooks' career is remarkable in that he is the only player in Major League Baseball history to have exactly four hits that comprise a cycle. He had a double and home run in his nine game with the Dodgers in 1993, then hit a single and triple in his five games with the Marlins in 1996. No other MLB player ever finished his career with exactly four hits; each of a different variety.

See also
1991 Caribbean Series

References

External links

The Baseball Gauge
1994–1995 Toros del Este Dominican League Champion (Spanish)
Venezuela Winter League

1967 births
Living people
African-American baseball players
Albuquerque Dukes players
American expatriate baseball players in Mexico
American expatriate baseball players in Japan
Bakersfield Dodgers players
Baseball players from Syracuse, New York
Charlotte Knights players
Clemson Tigers baseball players
Clemson University alumni
Cotuit Kettleers players
Elmira Pioneers players
Florida Marlins players
Great Falls Dodgers players
Indianapolis Indians players
Leones de Yucatán players
Leones del Caracas players
American expatriate baseball players in Venezuela
Los Angeles Dodgers players
Major League Baseball right fielders
Nippon Ham Fighters players
Norfolk Tides players
San Antonio Missions players
Tecolotes de los Dos Laredos players
Tiburones de La Guaira players
Tigres del Licey players
American expatriate baseball players in the Dominican Republic
Toros del Este players
21st-century African-American people
20th-century African-American sportspeople